Eugene Martinez may refer to:

 Eugene Martínez (footballer, born 1997), Belizean footballer
 Eugene Martinez (footballer, born 1957), English former footballer